Tangadapalli is a village in Nalgonda district in Telangana, India. It falls under Choutuppal mandal.

References

Villages in Nalgonda district